The Arboretum des Quintes (5 hectares) is an arboretum located in Laigné-en-Belin, Sarthe, Pays de la Loire, France. It contains several hundred trees and shrubs, consisting of oaks, chestnuts, fruit trees, and so forth, as well as one hectare planted with representative landscapes of the Sarthe, including hedges and orchards.

See also 
 List of botanical gardens in France

References 
 Commune de Laigné-en-Belin: An educational stroll at Laigné-en-Belin
 Commune de Laigné-en-Belin: La commune en bref (French)

Quintes, Arboretum des
Quintes, Arboretum des